The Selkirk Rex is a breed of cat with highly curled hair.

Background
The Selkirk Rex is distinct from all other Rex breeds. Unlike the Devon Rex and Cornish Rex, the hair is of normal length and not partly missing. There are longhair and shorthair varieties. It differs from the LaPerm in that the Selkirk Rex coat is plusher and thicker. While the LaPerm gene is a simple dominant, the Selkirk gene (Se) acts as an incomplete dominant; incompletely dominant allele pairs produce three possible genotypes and phenotypes: heterozygous cats (Sese) may have a fuller coat that is preferred in the show ring, while homozygous cats (SeSe) may have a tighter curl and less coat volume.

The Selkirk Rex originated in Montana, USA in 1987, with a litter born to a rescued cat. The only unusually coated kitten in the litter was ultimately placed with breeder, Jeri Newman, who named her Miss DiPesto (after a curly-haired character in the TV series Moonlighting played by Allyce Beasley). This foundation cat was bred to a black Persian tomcat, producing three Selkirk Rex and three straight-haired kittens. This demonstrated that the gene had an autosomal dominant mode of inheritance. All Selkirk Rex trace their ancestry back to the cat Miss DiPesto. Jeri Newman named the breed after her stepfather, "Selkirk," making this the first (and currently only) breed of cat to be named after an actual person.

The breed has been developed in two coat lengths, long and short. It is a large and solidly built breed, similar to a British Shorthair. The coat is very soft and has a woolly look and feel with loose, unstructured curls. The head is round, with large rounded eyes, medium-sized ears, and a distinct muzzle, whose length is equal to half its width. An extreme break, like that of a Persian, is a disqualifiable fault.

American Shorthairs, Persians, Himalayans, Exotic Shorthairs, and British Shorthairs have been used as outcrosses to develop this breed. The American Shorthair has now been discontinued as an outcross, except in The International Cat Association (TICA). The breed was accepted by The International Cat Association in 1992, the American Cat Fanciers Association in 1998, and the Cat Fanciers' Association in 2000. In Cat Fanciers' Association (CFA) and in Australia, all outcrosses are scheduled to be discontinued in 2015.

The breed is accepted in all colors, including the pointed, sepia, and mink varieties of albinism; bicolors; cinnamon; silver/smoke; and the chocolate and lilac series. This breed has an extremely dense coat and high propensity for shedding. Unlike other Rex breeds with reduced amounts of hair, the Selkirk Rex is not recommended for those who might be allergic to cat allergens.

The temperament of the Selkirk Rex reflects that of the breeds used in its development. They have a lot of the laid-back, reserved qualities of the British Shorthair, the cuddly nature of the Persian, and the playfulness of the Exotic Shorthair.

There are no known health problems specific to the Selkirk Rex breed. They are a robust breed. Breeding towards proper head structure is necessary to prevent kinking of the tear ducts, resulting in tear run down the front of the face, or muzzle creases that can result in dermatitis on the face. Like other Rex breeds, irritation of the inside of the ear by curly fur can occur, increasing the production of ear wax. Homozygous cats (with two copies of the dominant Selkirk Rex gene) may have a tendency towards excessive greasiness of the coat, requiring increased frequency of bathing. Other health problems may be inherited from the outcross breeds used, including polycystic kidney disease from Persians and hypertrophic cardiomyopathy from British Shorthairs. Responsible breeders screen their breeding cats for these diseases to minimize their impact on the breed.

In the UK, all Selkirk Rex registered with the Governing Council of the Cat Fancy (GCCF) for breeding are genetically tested for Polycystic Kidney Disease or are from two genetically tested parents.

Genetics 
The Selkirk Rex is defined by an autosomal dominant woolly rexoid hair (ADWH) abnormality that is characterized by tightly curled hair shafts. A splice variant in the gene KRT71 was found to be associated with the curly coat phenotype. KRT71 is a crucial gene for keratinization of the hair follicle. An allele of this gene is also responsible for the hairless (hr) Sphynx and the Devon Rex (re) hair. Three mutations in KRT71 have now been identified in cats, forming the allelic series, KRT71SADRE > KRT71+ > KRT71re > KRT71hr, where SADRE is the suggested locus designation for the Selkirk autosomal dominant rex
21 allele.

References 

Cat breeds
Cat breeds originating in the United States
Rex cat breeds